Fort Thomas High School is a high school serving grades 7–12 in Fort Thomas, Arizona. It is operated by the Fort Thomas Unified School District, which also operates an elementary school. Combined, the two schools have some 600 students; 93% of the student body is Native American. The original school building, used since 1925 and renovated since, was damaged in a 1959 fire and restored later in the year.

References

Public high schools in Arizona
Schools in Graham County, Arizona
1925 establishments in Arizona